The 2019 Ladies Open Hechingen was a professional tennis tournament played on outdoor clay courts. It was the twenty-first edition of the tournament which was part of the 2019 ITF Women's World Tennis Tour. It took place in Hechingen, Germany between 5 and 11 August 2019.

Singles main-draw entrants

Seeds

 1 Rankings are as of 29 July 2019.

Other entrants
The following players received wildcards into the singles main draw:
  Katharina Hobgarski
  Laura Schaeder
  Carmen Schultheiss
  Alexandra Vecic

The following players received entry from the qualifying draw:
  Kamilla Bartone
  Michaela Bayerlová
  Anna Gabric
  Eleni Kordolaimi
  Tayisiya Morderger
  Teliana Pereira
  Melanie Stokke
  Julia Wachaczyk

Champions

Singles

 Barbara Haas def.  Olga Danilović, 6–2, 6–1

Doubles

 Cristina Dinu /  Lina Gjorcheska def.  Olga Danilović /  Georgina García Pérez, 4–6, 7–5, [10–7]

References

External links
 2019 Ladies Open Hechingen at ITFtennis.com
 Official website

2019 ITF Women's World Tennis Tour
2019 in German tennis
Ladies Open Hechingen